Davy Byrne's pub is a public house located at 21 Duke Street, Dublin. It was made famous by its appearance in Chapter 8 ('Lestrygonians') of James Joyce's 1922 modernist novel Ulysses, set on Thursday 16 June 1904. The main character, advertising canvasser Leopold Bloom, stops at around 1 p.m. for a gorgonzola cheese sandwich and a glass of burgundy while wandering through Dublin.

The pub has since become a pilgrimage point for fans of the novel, who, like Bloom, stop and have a cheese sandwich and a glass of wine.  The pub is particularly popular on Bloomsday, an annual 16 June celebration of both the book and James Joyce.

Joyce also mentioned the pub in the short story "Counterparts" in Dubliners as a bar visited by the office clerk protagonist named Farrington following an altercation with his senior at the office. It is also mentioned in Green Rushes, a short story collection by Maurice Walsh.

Excerpts from Ulysses
He entered Davy Byrne's. Moral pub. He doesn't chat. Stands a drink now and then. But in leapyear once in four. Cashed a cheque for me once.

What will I take now? He drew his watch. Let me see now. Shandygaff?

—Hello, Bloom, Nosey Flynn said from his nook.

—Hello, Flynn.

—How's things?

—Tiptop ... Let me see. I'll take a glass of burgundy and ... let me see.

•••

—Have you a cheese sandwich?

—Yes, sir.

Like a few olives too if they had them. Italian I prefer. Good glass of burgundy take away that. Lubricate. A nice salad, cool as a cucumber, Tom Kernan can dress. Puts gusto into it. Pure olive oil. Milly served me that cutlet with a sprig of parsley. Take one Spanish onion. God made food, the devil the cooks. Devilled crab.

—Wife well?

—Quite well, thanks ... A cheese sandwich, then. Gorgonzola, have you?

—Yes, sir.

•••

Davy Byrne came forward from the hindbar in tuckstitched shirtsleeves, cleaning his lips with two wipes of his napkin. Herring's blush. Whose smile upon each feature plays with such and such replete. Too much fat on the parsnips.

—And here's himself and pepper on him, Nosey Flynn said. Can you give us a good one for the Gold cup?

—I'm off that, Mr Flynn, Davy Byrne answered. I never put anything on a horse.

—You're right there, Nosey Flynn said.

Mr Bloom ate his strips of sandwich, fresh clean bread, with relish of disgust, pungent mustard, the feety savour of green cheese. Sips of his wine soothed his palate. Not logwood that. Tastes fuller this weather with the chill off.

Nice quiet bar. Nice piece of wood in that counter. Nicely planed. Like the way it curves there.

See also
 List of pubs in Dublin

References

 
 

Ulysses (novel)
Pubs in Dublin (city)